Novonikolayevsk Resettlement Center is a center for assistance to migrants, opened in 1895. It was located on the territory of modern Zheleznodorozhny City District of Novosibirsk, Russia.

History
The Resettlement Center was built near the railway station in the pine forest. It was fenced and included barracks, a first-aid post, a canteen, a warehouse of agricultural machines, an office of a resettlement official.

From 20 June to 2 August 1900, there was the eye clinic of R. V. Putyata-Kerschbaum, female doctor.

In 1910, Pyotr Stolypin visited the Resettlement Center.

During World War I, the Center accepted refugees.

At present, the territory of the former Resettlement Center is occupied by the Road Clinical Hospital and some streets of the city.

Bibliography

External links
 Chronicle of Novosibirsk 1893–1916. Novosibirsk Museum.
 Vecherny Novosibirsk. Вечерний Новосибирск.

History of Novosibirsk
Zheleznodorozhny City District, Novosibirsk
Refugee camps in Asia
1895 establishments in the Russian Empire